Željka Čižmešija (born 19 October 1970) is a Croatian retired figure skater. She placed as high as 11th at the European Championships (1987, 1989) and competed at two Winter Olympics (1988, 1992). She was the first woman to represent Croatia at the Olympics.

Career 
Čižmešija began appearing internationally for SFR Yugoslavia in the 1980s. She finished 13th at the 1984 World Junior Championships. In 1986, she made her first appearances at senior-level ISU Championships, placing 16th at Europeans and 21st at Worlds. 

The following season, Čižmešija finished 11th at the 1987 European Championships in Sarajevo and 16th at the 1987 World Championships in Cincinnati. She placed 22nd at the 1988 Winter Olympics in Calgary, Canada. She had another 11th-place finish at the 1989 European Championships in Birmingham, England.

On 7 March 1990, at the 1990 World Championships, Čižmešija became the last skater to perform a compulsory figure in international competition (David Liu having previously become the last male skater to do it). Both she and Liu received certificates for it. 

In her final season, Čižmešija represented Croatia. Training was difficult due to the war and lack of ice. She placed 25th at the 1992 Winter Olympics in Albertville, France. She retired from competition at the end of the season.

Personal life 
Željka Čižmešija is the sister of Tomislav Čižmešija, who competed in men's singles for Croatia at the 1992 Olympics.

Results

References

1970 births
Yugoslav female single skaters
Croatian female single skaters
Figure skaters at the 1988 Winter Olympics
Figure skaters at the 1992 Winter Olympics
Olympic figure skaters of Yugoslavia
Olympic figure skaters of Croatia
Living people
Sportspeople from Zagreb